This is a list of Kappa Kappa Psi brothers, commonly referred to as Psis, and includes undergraduate and honorary members of Kappa Kappa Psi (ΚΚΨ), national honorary fraternity for college bandmembers. Kappa Kappa Psi was founded on November 27, 1919, at Oklahoma Agricultural and Mechanical College in Stillwater, Oklahoma. Kappa Kappa Psi became a coeducational organization in 1977, and at the national convention in 1989, the fraternity voted to call all members "brothers" regardless of sex or gender.

There are currently 210 active chapters out of 314 chapters that have been chartered since 1919 and 7 colonies.

Prominent members

Founding Fathers 

 William Alexander Scroggs, "Founder"
 William Houston Coppedge
 Clyde DeWitt Haston
 George Asher Hendrickson
 Dick Hurst
 A. Frank Martin, "Mr. Kappa Kappa Psi"
 Iron Hawthorne Nelson
 Raymond David Shannon
 Clayton Everett Soule
 Carl Anderson Stevens

Other important early members 

These members were not undergraduate members or considered "founding fathers," but were important to the early success of the fraternity.

 Dr. Hilton Ira Jones, professor of chemistry; gave the name and Greek letters "Kappa Kappa Psi"
 Bohumil Makovsky, the "Guiding Spirit" of Kappa Kappa Psi; Oklahoma A&M band director
 Colonel Frank D. Wickham, ROTC Commandant; assisted with work on the Ritual

Band leaders 

 Herbert L. Clarke
 Henry Fillmore
 Edwin Franko Goldman
 Richard Franko Goldman
 Derek Hilliard
 George S. Howard
 Karl King
 Paul Lavalle
 Frank Simon
 John Philip Sousa

Composers 

 Leroy Anderson
 Milton Babbitt
 Robert Russell Bennett
 Lucien Caillet
 Hoagy Carmichael
 Jay Chattaway
 Paul Creston
 Norman Dello Joio
 Don Gillis
 Julie Giroux
 Morton Gould
 Ferde Grofe
 David Holsinger
 Karel Husa
 David Maslanka
 Bill Moffit
 Václav Nelhýbel
 Robert W. Smith

Educators 

 Leonard Falcone
 Frederick Fennell
 William P. Foster
 Isaac B. Greggs
 Tim Lautzenheiser
 Tyler Long
 Joseph Maddy
 William Revelli
 H. Robert Reynolds
 Thomas Tyra
 Herman B Wells
 John Whitwell

Performing artists 

 Count Basie
 William Bell
 Velvet Brown
 Ray Charles
 Van Cliburn
 John Denver
 Mo B. Dick
 Dwele
 Earth, Wind & Fire
 Maynard Ferguson
 Pete Fountain
 Dizzy Gillespie
 Al Hirt
 Dave Hollister
 Freddie Hubbard
 Stan Kenton
 Ellie Mannette
 Branford Marsalis
 Wynton Marsalis
 Harvey Phillips
 Sigurd Rascher
 Buddy Rich
 Lionel Richie
 Peter Schickele ("P. D. Q. Bach")
 Doc Severinsen
 Ed Shaughnessy
 Red Skelton
 Rickey Smiley
 Midnight Star
 Fred Waring
 Lawrence Welk
 D'Extra Wiley

Others 
 Neil Armstrong, Apollo 11 astronaut and first person to walk on the moon
 Lauro Cavazos, United States Secretary of Education
 Bill Clinton, President of the United States
 Bob Knight, long-time coach of the Indiana Hoosiers men's basketball team
 Chuck Norris, actor
 Truman Washington Dailey, member of the Otoe-Missouria Tribe of Indians and last native speaker of the Chiwere language

References 

List of brothers
Kappa Kappa Psi